The 1875 State of the Union Address was given by Ulysses S. Grant, the 18th president of the United States on Tuesday, December 7, 1875. It was written by him, but not presented to the 44th United States Congress by him. He said, "In submitting my seventh annual message to Congress, in this centennial year of our national existence as a free and independent people, it affords me great pleasure to recur to the advancement that has been made from the time of the colonies, one hundred years ago. We were then a people numbering only 3,000,000. Now we number more than 40,000,000. Then industries were confined almost exclusively to the tillage of the soil. Now manufactories absorb much of the labor of the country."  The Industrial Revolution had begun.

References

State of the Union addresses
Presidency of Ulysses S. Grant
Works by Ulysses S. Grant
44th United States Congress
State of the Union Address
State of the Union Address
State of the Union Address
State of the Union Address
December 1875 events
State of the Union